The forkshell or Lewis pearly mussel, scientific name Epioblasma lewisii, was a species of freshwater mussel, an aquatic bivalve mollusk in the family Unionidae, the river mussels.

This species was endemic to the drainages of the Ohio River, Cumberland River and the Tennessee River in the United States.  Its natural habitat was shallow riffle-beds of large rivers. This habitat was largely destroyed by dam construction and  canalization, and the last populations of this species died sometime during the middle of the 20th century. Only a single museum specimen was collected that preserved the internal soft tissues.

It appears to be closely related to Epioblasma flexuosa, which is also now extinct.

References

Epioblasma
Molluscs described in 1910
Taxa named by Edmund Murton Walker
Taxonomy articles created by Polbot